Ciudad Constitución Airport  is an airport serving the Palcazu River town of Ciudad Constitución in the Pasco Region of Peru.

See also

Transport in Peru
List of airports in Peru

References

External links
OpenStreetMap - Ciudad Constitución
OurAirports - Ciudad Constitución
SkyVector - Ciudad Constitución
Ciudad Constitución Airport

Airports in Peru
Buildings and structures in Pasco Region